Douglas may refer to:

People
 Douglas (given name)
 Douglas (surname)

Animals 
Douglas (parrot), macaw that starred as the parrot Rosalinda in Pippi Longstocking
Douglas the camel, a camel in the Confederate Army in the American Civil War

Businesses 
 Douglas Aircraft Company
 Douglas (cosmetics), German cosmetics retail chain in Europe
 Douglas (motorcycles), British motorcycle manufacturer

Peerage and Baronetage
 Duke of Douglas
 Earl of Douglas, or any holder of the title
 Marquess of Douglas, or any holder of the title
 Douglas Baronets

Peoples 
 Clan Douglas, a Scottish kindred
 Dougla people, West Indians of both African and East Indian heritage

Places

Australia
 Douglas, Queensland, a suburb of Townsville
 Douglas, Queensland (Toowoomba Region), a locality
 Port Douglas, North Queensland, Australia
 Shire of Douglas, in northern Queensland

Belize
 Douglas, Belize

Canada
 Douglas, New Brunswick
 Douglas Parish, New Brunswick
 Douglas, Ontario, a community in Admaston/Bromley township
 Douglas, British Columbia, the community at the Peace Arch border crossing
 The Canadian inspection station of the Peace Arch Border Crossing is known as Douglas
 Douglas, Manitoba, a settlement in the Rural Municipality of Elton
 Rural Municipality of Douglas No. 436, Saskatchewan

England
 Douglas (ward), an electoral ward of the Wigan Metropolitan Borough Council
 River Douglas, Lancashire

Falkland Islands
 Douglas, Falkland Islands

Ireland
 Douglas, Cork, a suburb of Cork City

Isle of Man
 Douglas, Isle of Man, the capital of the dependency, and seat of the House of Keys

New Zealand
 Douglas, Taranaki
 Douglas, Canterbury
 Douglas Peak

Northern Ireland
 Douglas, County Antrim, a townland in County Antrim
 Douglas, County Tyrone, a townland in County Tyrone

South Africa
 Douglas, Northern Cape

Scotland
 Castle Douglas, Dumfries and Galloway
 Douglas, South Lanarkshire
 Douglas Castle, South Lanarkshire
 Douglas Water, South Lanarkshire
 Glen Douglas, Argyll and Bute
 Douglas, Dundee

United States
 Douglas, Alabama
 Douglas, Alaska
 Douglas, Arizona
 Douglas, Georgia
 Douglas, Chicago, Illinois
 Douglas, Knox County, Illinois, an unincorporated community in Knox County
 Douglas, St. Clair County, Illinois, an unincorporated community in St. Clair County
 Douglas, Indiana
 Douglas, Massachusetts
 Douglas, Michigan
 Douglas, Olmsted County, Minnesota,  an unincorporated community in Olmsted County
 Douglas, Nebraska
 Douglas, North Dakota
 Douglas, Ohio
 Douglas, Oklahoma
 Douglas, Washington
 Douglas, West Virginia
 Douglas, Wisconsin, a town
 Douglas Center, Wisconsin, an unincorporated community
 Douglas, Wyoming

Plants 
 Douglas iris, a wildflower
 Douglas fir, the common name for a type of coniferous tree

Ships 
 : a paddle-steamer of the Isle of Man Steam Packet Company which subsequently became a blockade runner for the Confederate Navy during the American Civil War under the name Margaret & Jessie, before subsequently serving in the Union Navy as the USS Gettysburg.
 : the second steamer in the fleet of the Isle of Man Steam Packet Company to bear the name.
 : originally a packet steamer of the London and Southwestern Railway named Dora. Acquired by the Isle of Man Steam Packet Company in 1901 and re-named Douglas.
 : a freight vessel built for the Clyde Shipbuilding and Engineering in Port Glasgow for Goole Steam Shipping Company.

Other uses
 Douglas (film), a 1970 Norwegian film
 Douglas (locomotive), a preserved locomotive on the Talyllyn Railway in Wales
 Douglas GAA, a Gaelic Athletic Association club from Douglas, Cork, Ireland
 Hannah Gadsby: Douglas (2019), live comedy performance written and performed by Australian comedian Hannah Gadsby
 Donald and Douglas, a pair of fictional Scottish twin engines from Thomas the Tank Engine and Friends
 Hurricane Douglas, a name used for seven northeastern Pacific Ocean tropical cyclones

See also 
 Douglas County (disambiguation)
 Douglas House (disambiguation)
 Douglas International Airport (disambiguation)
 Douglas Township (disambiguation)
 Douglas-Daly (disambiguation)
 Camp Douglas (disambiguation)
 Justice Douglas (disambiguation)
 Lord Douglas (disambiguation)
 Mount Douglas (disambiguation)
 
 
 Douglass (disambiguation)
 Doug, a given name